Hampstead Town is a ward in the London Borough of Camden, in the United Kingdom. It covers most of Hampstead Village, the western half of Hampstead Heath, North End and the Vale of Health. The more residential Frognal ward covers much of the rest of Hampstead.

The ward has existed since the creation of the borough on 1 April 1965 and was first used in the 1964 elections. The boundaries were redrawn in May 1978, May 2002 and May 2022. In the most recent set of changes, the southernmost area of the ward was transferred to Belsize and Gospel Oak wards, and the number of councillors was reduced from three to two. The ward's current boundaries have been in effect since the 2022 election, and the ward's three polling stations are at Burgh House, Fitzjohn's Primary School and Keats Community Library. In 2018, the ward had an electorate of 6,214. The Boundary Commission projects the electorate to rise to 6,328 in 2025.

The ward has historically been represented by either Conservative or Liberal Democrat councillors. The first Liberal Democrat councillors, Margaret Little and John Dickie, were elected in May 1994. Dickie, however, had taken the Labour whip by December 1995, to the surprise of the Liberal Democrat group leader, Flick Rea, who called for him to stand down. He continued as a councillor for the ward until the 1998 election, when he was elected as a Labour councillor in Grafton. In May 2022, Adrian Cohen became the ward's first elected Labour councillor. However, Cohen announced 21 days after the election that he would not be taking up his seat on the council, forcing a by-election to be held on 7 July 2022. Former Liberal Democrat councillor Linda Chung was elected in Cohen's place.

The ward's notable councillors have included two Conservative leaders of the opposition, Alan Greengross (1974–1978) and Oliver Cooper (2015–2022), Archie Macdonald, former Liberal MP for Roxburgh and Selkirk and Labour councillor Adrian Cohen, who founded the London Jewish Forum.

Councillors
Following the ward's creation in 1964, it was represented by three councillors; this increased to four from 1971 to 1978, before being reduced to two between 1978 and 2002. From 2002 to 2022, the ward was represented by three councillors. This reverted to two councillor representation from 2022, as a result of boundary changes.

From 2022 
Two councillors currently represent Hampstead Town.

2002–2022 
Three councillors represented Hampstead Town ward between 2002 and 2022.

1978–2002 
Two councillors represented Hampstead Town ward between 1978 and 2002.

1971–1978 
Four councillors represented Hampstead Town ward between 1971 and 1978.

1964–1971 
Three councillors represented Hampstead Town ward between 1964 and 1971.

Election results 
The last election was held on 5 May 2022. Previous councillors standing for re-election are denoted with an asterisk (*).

Elections in the 2020s

Elections in the 2010s

Elections in the 2000s

Elections in the 1990s

Elections in the 1980s

Elections in the 1970s

Elections in the 1960s

References

Wards of the London Borough of Camden
1965 establishments in England